Paserkanlu (also Romanized as Paserkānlū; also known as Basurkanlu) is a village in Badranlu Rural District, in the Central District of Bojnord County, North Khorasan Province, Iran. At the 2006 census, its population was 307, in 77 families.

References 

Populated places in Bojnord County